Phulliani is a town and Union Council of Kasur District in the Punjab province of Pakistan. It is part of Pattoki Tehsil and is located at 31°7'30N 73°58'10E with an altitude of 191 metres (629 feet).

References

Kasur District